Plastic Wax is an Australian animation and visual effects studio specializing in pre-rendered CG for video games, film and television.

Based in Sydney, Australia and established in 1997; Plastic Wax has produced a wide range of award-winning animation content. Some notable works are Injustice 2, Hitman 2, Evil Within II, Game of Thrones Conquest, Gears of War Ultimate Edition, Lego Star Wars: The Force Awakens, Transformers: Revenge of the Fallen, Tomb Raider, Civilization VI and Fallout: New Vegas , Battle Kitty.

Projects of note

Awards

See also

List of film production companies
List of television production companies

References

External links
 
 Plastic Wax Studios [au] IMDB

Visual effects companies
Cinematography organizations
Australian animation studios